The following is a list of massacres that have occurred in Nagaland.

Before Statehood (prior to 1963)

After Nagaland Statehood (since 1963)

See also 

 Ethnic conflict in Nagaland

References

Nagaland-related lists
History of Nagaland

 Massacres in India
Massacres
Lists of massacres